was a town located in Higashiuwa District, Ehime Prefecture, Japan.

As of 2003, the town had an estimated population of 4,583 and a density of 36.00 persons per km². The total area was 127.31 km².

On April 1, 2004, Shirokawa, along with the towns of Akehama, Nomura and Uwa (all from Higashiuwa District), and the town of Mikame (from Nishiuwa District), was merged to create the city of Seiyo.

External links
 Official website of Seiyo 

Dissolved municipalities of Ehime Prefecture
Seiyo, Ehime